Christoph is a male given name and surname. It is a German variant of Christopher.

Notable people with the given name Christoph
 Christoph Bach (1613–1661), German musician
 Christoph Büchel (born 1966), Swiss artist
 Christoph Dientzenhofer (1655–1722), German architect
 Christoph Harting (born 1990), German athlete specialising in the discus throw
 Christoph M. Herbst (born 1966), German actor
 Christoph Kramer (born 1991), German football player and winner of the 2014 FIFA World Cup
 Christoph M. Kimmich (born 1939), German-American historian and eighth President of Brooklyn College
 Christoph Metzelder (born 1980), German football player
 Christoph Riegler (born 1992), Austrian football player
 Christoph Waltz (born 1956), German-Austrian actor and two times winner of the OSCARS Academy Award
 Christoph M. Wieland (1733–1813), German poet and writer
 Prince Christoph of Württemberg (1515–1568), German regent and duke of the Duchy of Württemberg
 Prince Christoph of Schleswig-Holstein (born 1949), German hereditary prince and head of the House of Glücksburg
 Prince Christoph of Hesse (1901–1943), German officer and Oberführer of the Schutzstaffel (SS)

Notable people with the surname Christoph
 Manfred Christoph (born 1931), German chess player
 Wensley Christoph (born 1984), Surinamese football player

See also
 Chris
 Christof
 Christoff
 Christophe (disambiguation)
 Christopher (disambiguation)

German masculine given names
Surnames from given names
br:Kristof
cs:Kryštof
eo:Kristoforo
it:Cristoforo
hu:Kristóf
pl:Krzysztof
sk:Krištof
sl:Krištof